Surana may refer to:

 Surana, Mahendragarh, a village in Haryana, India
 Surana, Bhopal, a village in Madhya Pradesh, India